"Tomorrow (A Better You, a Better Me)" is a song originally recorded by the Brothers Johnson as an instrumental in 1976 on the album Look Out for #1.

Quincy Jones/Tevin Campbell version

In 1989, Siedah Garrett wrote lyrics to the song, and it was recorded by Quincy Jones featuring Tevin Campbell on vocals for the album Back on the Block.  The new version of the song spent one week at number one on the US R&B chart and peaked at number seventy-five on the US pop chart in June 1990. It was Campbell's first number-one R&B single and first single to enter the Billboard Hot 100.

Personnel
 Tevin Campbell – Lead Vocals
 McKinley Brown – Background Vocals
 Kenneth Ford – Background Vocals
 Jaimee Foxworth  – Background Vocals
 Siedah Garrett – Choir Director
 Rose Banks – Choir Director
 Chad Durio – Background Vocals
 Alex Harris – Background Vocals
 Reginale Green – Background Vocals
 Charity Young – Background Vocals
 Shane Shoaf – Background Vocals
 Tyren Perry – Background Vocals
 Tiffany Johnson – Background Vocals
 Donovan McCrary – Background Vocals
 Salim Grant – Guitar
 Jerry Hey – Arranger
 Gerald Albright – Alto saxophone solo
 Steve Lukather – Guitar
 Ollie Brown – Percussion
 John Robinson – Drums
 Bruce Swedien – Recording Engineer, Mixing
 Brad Sundberg – Technical Director, additional engineering
 Bill Summers – hindewhu
 Randy Kerber – Keyboards, Bass Synth
 Greg Phillinganes – Fender Rhodes
 Rod Temperton – Arranger
 Quincy Jones – Arranger

In 1990, smooth jazz musician Nelson Rangell covered the song from his self-titled album.

Tomorrow/Bokra

Tomorrow / Bokra is the Arab version of the song which is produced by Quincy Jones, RedOne & Badr Jafar.

The lyrics were written by the Lebanese singer Majida El Roumi and music was rearranged by Kadim Al Sahir.

The music video was directed by Malek Akkad son of deceased Arab film director Moustapha Akkad. It features the artists performing their sections of the song in close-ups or collectively and children running and / or playing sports.

The song featured 24 Arab singers representing 16 Arab nations across the Middle East and North Africa plus Akon and Shakira who introduced it.

The singers taking part are:
(in alphabetical order of family name)

The recording and filming was done over two phases. The first phase of filming took place in May 2011 in Rabat in Morocco supported by the annual Mawazine music festival. The second and final phase of recording and filming took place in Doha in October 2011. The second phase was in collaboration with Associate Producers, the Doha Film Institute (DFI), and the Qatar Museums Authority.

They will be relaunching Tomorrow/Bokra with new artists for the 10th anniversary.

Global premiere
The world premiere of Tomorrow-Bokra was held in Dubai on 11 November 2011, at the One&Only, The Palm in Dubai. The event was held under the royal patronage of Sheikha Hind bint Maktoum bin Juma Al Maktoum, wife of Shaikh Mansour bin Zayed Al Nahyan. The world premiere of the song and video was simulcast live on MBC in the Middle East and North Africa, and on the youtube.com/tomorrowbokra channel in other parts of the world.

Bokra the Film
Bokra The Film, featured the formation of the charity song and music video of Tomorrow-Bokra and its impact on the lives of disadvantaged youth. It premiered at the Dubai International Film Festival (DIFF) on 17 December 2014 Madinat Souk Theatre in the Madinat Jumeirah Hotel in Dubai. The film sponsors were the Global Gumbo Group (G3). It was directed by Emirati filmmaker Ahmed Abdulqader and co-produced by Grammy Award-winning music producer Quincy Jones, Emirati social entrepreneur Badr Jafar, and Emirati director Ali F. Mostafa. The film showcases the influence of the arts on disadvantage youths in war-ravaged nations from Morocco to Jordan.

See also
 R&B number-one hits of 1990 (USA)

References

External links
 Official music video
 Official website
 Official YouTube channel

1976 songs
1989 singles
The Brothers Johnson songs
Quincy Jones songs
Tevin Campbell songs
Songs written by Siedah Garrett
Song recordings produced by Quincy Jones
Qwest Records singles
Songs written by Louis Johnson (bassist)